Cristian Alexandru Dulca (born 25 October 1972) is a Romanian professional football coach and former player, who is currently in charge of the Romania women's national team.

Playing career
As a player, Dulca represented CFR Cluj, Gloria Bistrița, Rapid București, Ceahlăul Piatra Neamț, Gaz Metan Mediaș and  Universitatea Cluj in his native Romania. He also had two spells abroad in South Korea and Hungary, with Pohang Steelers and Budapest Honvéd, respectively.

At international level, Dulca was included by head coach Anghel Iordănescu in the Romania national team squad for the 1998 FIFA World Cup. He totalled six appearances for the country between 1997 and 1998.

In 2003, Dulca was forced to retire from football because of a congenital heart defect.

Coaching career
Following his retirement from playing, Dulca became the head coach of Minerul Iara, the Divizia C feeder team for Universitatea Cluj. The next year, he coached another Divizia C team, Avântul Reghin, for 13 matches. In February 2005, Dulca became assistant executive director at Universitatea Cluj.

Personal life
Dulca's son, Marco, is also a professional footballer and plays as a midfielder.

Honours

Player
Rapid București
Divizia A: 1998–99
Cupa României: 1997–98

References

External links

1972 births
Living people
Sportspeople from Cluj-Napoca
Romanian footballers
Association football defenders
Romanian expatriate sportspeople in Hungary
Romanian expatriate footballers
Romania international footballers
CFR Cluj players
ACF Gloria Bistrița players
FC Rapid București players
Pohang Steelers players
CSM Ceahlăul Piatra Neamț players
CS Gaz Metan Mediaș players
FC Universitatea Cluj players
Budapest Honvéd FC players
Liga I players
K League 1 players
Nemzeti Bajnokság I players
Expatriate footballers in South Korea
Expatriate footballers in Hungary
Romanian expatriate sportspeople in South Korea
1998 FIFA World Cup players
Romanian football managers
FC Vaslui managers
FC Universitatea Cluj managers
CS Gaz Metan Mediaș managers
CS Luceafărul Oradea managers
ACS Viitorul Târgu Jiu managers